1-Pentanol, (or n-pentanol, pentan-1-ol), is an alcohol with five carbon atoms and the molecular formula C5H11OH. 1-Pentanol is a colourless liquid with a distinctive aroma. It is the straight-chain form of amyl alcohol, one of 8 isomers with that formula. 

The hydroxyl group (OH) is the active site of many reactions. The ester formed from 1-pentanol and butyric acid is pentyl butyrate, which smells like apricot. The  ester formed from 1-pentanol and acetic acid is amyl acetate (also called pentyl acetate), which smells like banana.

In 2014, a study was conducted comparing the performance of diesel fuel blends with various proportions of pentanol as an additive. While gaseous emissions increased with higher concentrations of pentanol, particulate emissions decreased.

Pentanol can be used as a solvent for coating CDs and DVDs. 

Pentanol can be prepared by fractional distillation of fusel oil. To reduce the use of fossil fuels, research is underway to develop cost-effective methods of producing (chemically identical) bio-pentanol with fermentation.

References

Alkanols
Primary alcohols
GABAA receptor positive allosteric modulators
Sedatives
Hypnotics